The 2011 Ultimate Indoor Football League season was the first season of the league. The regular season lasted from February 18 to May 29 and the postseason, will be held the following two weeks with the championship game being held at the highest remaining seed. The 2011 season went off without any teams folding or any games being missed or rescheduled. The Northern Kentucky River Monsters finished with the best regular season record, finished 11–3. However, due to league sanctions they were not able to host an playoff games and were dropped to a four seed.

Saginaw finished 9–5, followed by Eastern Kentucky 8–6, Huntington 7–7, Johnstown 6–8 and Canton 1–13.

Saginaw defeated Northern Kentucky, 48–47, in the first semifinals of the Ultimate Bowl I Playoffs, sponsored by Trophy Awards. In the other semifinal game, Eastern Kentucky advanced to the championship game with a 20–4 victory over Huntington. The 2011 Ultimate Bowl, sponsored by Trophy Awards, was played Friday, June 9 at the Dow Center in Saginaw, MI with the Sting claiming an 86–69 victory over the visiting Drillers.

Following the elimination of the Northern Kentucky River Monsters from the playoffs, NKY owner Jill Chitwood and the UIFL came to terms that allowed the River Monsters to leave the UIFL, but the team folded after rumors of joining the Continental Indoor Football League.

UIFL Draft 

The following is the breakdown of the 24 players selected by position:

Standings

y - clinched regular-season title

x - clinched playoff spot

Statistics

Passing

Rushing

Receiving

2011 Playoffs

Awards

Most Valuable Player, Jared Lorenzen QB Northern Kentucky 
Offensive Player of the Year, Tommy Jones QB Saginaw 
Defensive Player of the Year, Thomas McKenzie DL Northern Kentucky

1st Team All-UIFL

2nd Team All-UIFL

Players of the Week

References

2011 Ultimate Indoor Football League season